Prasada Rao or Prasadarao is one of the Indian names.

 Akkineni Lakshmi Vara Prasada Rao shortly L. V. Prasad, an Indian film actor, producer and director.
 B. G. Prasada Rao was the third successor of Frank Whittaker as bishop in Medak. 
 Nanduri Prasada Rao was a famous freedom fighter.
 Vangapandu Prasada Rao is an Indian poet, lyricist and actor.